The Women's 10 kilometre biathlon pursuit competition at the 2006 Winter Olympics in Turin, Italy was held on 18 February, at Cesana San Sicario. Competitors in this biathlon raced over five loops of a 2.0 kilometre skiing course, shooting twenty times, ten prone and ten standing. Each miss required a competitor to ski a 150-metre penalty loop.

The starting order for the pursuit was based on the results of the sprint; the top 60 finishers in that race qualified for the pursuit. In addition, each racer's final deficit behind sprint winner Florence Baverel-Robert corresponded to their starting deficit in the pursuit; Anna Carin Olofsson, who finished 2 seconds behind Fischer in the sprint, started 2 seconds after her in the pursuit.

The winner was the first racer over the finish line, Kati Wilhelm. Skiers who were lapped were not ranked in the official results.

At the 2005 World Championships, Germany's Uschi Disl successfully defended her four-second lead after the sprint event to win the pursuit, while Russian Olga Pyleva won the event at the 2002 Olympics. Kati Wilhelm led the pursuit World Cup standings before the Olympics, ahead of Sandrine Bailly of France and Disl.

Results 
The race was held at 12:30.

References

Women's biathlon at the 2006 Winter Olympics